Ak-Bulak is a locality in Turkmenistan.

References

Populated places in Lebap Region